The Farmers Bank of China was a Chinese bank founded on April 1, 1933, in Hankou (modern day Wuhan) from the amalgamation of provincial agricultural banks in Henan, Hubei, Anhui and Jiangxi. Governed by the Farmers Bank of China Law, the bank was established to stimulate agricultural development by providing lines of credit to farmers and rural landowners. The loans were intended for use to purchase equipment and crops. The bank was initially under majority government ownership.

The bank became one of the four major banks of the Nationalist era of China. Along with the Central Bank of China (currently the Central Bank of the Republic of China), Bank of China and Bank of Communications, the Farmers Bank of China was allowed to issue its own banknotes until 1942. 

The bank was relocated to Chongqing in 1937, along with Kuomintang-led Nationalist Government during Second Sino-Japanese War and relocated to the former Japanese colony of Taiwan in 1949 because of the Chinese Civil War. However, it was not until May 20, 1967 that the bank resumed operations after relocating to Taiwan. 

The Government of the People's Republic of China incorporated the bank's assets in Mainland China into the People's Bank of China, but later transferred these to the Agricultural Bank of China. 

From 1967 until 2006, the bank opened and operated 107 branches throughout Taiwan. It also operated overseas offices in Los Angeles and Seattle.

The Taiwanese government undertook a reform of the banking industry in 1992 with the listing of state-owned banks on the stock exchange. The Farmers Bank of China was partially privatized in 1994, and all government shares were put on the market in 1999. Accordingly, the Farmers Bank of China Law was repealed by Legislative Yuan in 2005 to complete full privatization of the bank.

The bank was the 14th largest lender in Taiwan until the bank was acquired by the Taiwan Cooperative Bank on May 1, 2006.

Former Chairmen
Xie Dongmin 1947-1952
Li Lianchun 1952-1972
Hong Qiaorong 1972-1978
Ye Xinming 1978-1981
Zhang Xunshun 1981-1988
Xu Minhui 1988-1991
Luo Jitang 1991-1994
Bu Zhengming Feb 1994 - Nov 1994
Liao Hebi 1994-1996
Li Wenxiong 1996-2001
Liang Chengjin 2001-2004
Chen Zhong 2004-2006

References

External links
 Taiwan Cooperative Bank website
 Chronicles of the Farmers Bank of China

Banks of Taiwan
Defunct banks of China
Banks established in 1933
Chinese companies established in 1933